Ciprefadol is an opioid analgesic that is an isoquinoline derivative most closely related to cyclazocine and picenadol, with a number of other related compounds known. Ciprefadol is a mixed agonist–antagonist at μ-opioid receptors and can partly block the effects of morphine at low doses, though at higher doses it acts more like a full agonist. It is also a potent κ-opioid agonist, unlike the corresponding N-methyl and N-phenethyl derivatives which are reasonably μ-selective agonists.

Synthesis
Fusion of an alicyclic ring onto the piperidine so as to form a perhydroisoquinoline is apparently consistent with
analgesic activity.

The Michael addition between 2-(3-Methoxyphenyl)Cyclohexanone [15547-89-4] (1) and acrylonitrile gives CID:20460008 (2). Hydrolysis of the nitrile to the corresponding acid gives CID:20334481 (3). FGI to the acyl azide (4) followed by Curtius rearrangement leads to isocyanate CID:85857788 (5). Acid
hydrolysis leads directly to the indoline, CID:427266 (6), by internal Schiff base formation of the intermediate amine. 

Methylation by means of trimethyloxonium tetrafluoroborate affords ternary iminium salt (7). Treatment of that reactive carbonyl-like functionality with diazomethane gives the so-called azonia salt (8) (note the analogy to the hypothetical oxirane involved in ring expansion of ketones with diazomethane). 

Exposure of the aziridinium intermediate to base leads to ring opening and consequent formation of the octahydroisoquinoline, CID:12884444 (9). Reduction of the enamine (catalytic or borohydride) affords the perhydroisoquinoline [58414-81-6] (10). The N-demethylation sequence gives CID:13640225 (11). O-Demethylation of the phenol ether gives CID:14020576.

Alkylation with cyclopropylcarbonylchloride [4023-34-1] followed by reduction of the amide with lithium borohydride completes the preparation of ciprefadol (12).

References 

Synthetic opioids
Mu-opioid receptor agonists
Phenols
Decahydroisoquinolines